Sandy White may refer to:

 Sandy White (footballer), Scottish footballer
 Sandy White (programmer), British computer game programmer